Geelong Rangers Football Club is an Australian soccer club based in Geelong, Australia. The club currently competes in the Victorian State League Division 2 North-West, the regionalized fifth division of the Australian soccer league system.

History
Geelong Rangers claimed the 2008 Victorian State League Division 3 championship with 43 points, five points clear of second placed Sydenham Park, and were promoted to the Victorian State League Division 2 for the 2009 season.

Upon the club's relegation from the Victorian State League Division 2 North-West to the Victorian State League Division 3 North-West in 2010, the club appointed former South African footballer Dale Harris as the first-team coach.

Rangers finished the 2011 season in bottom place of the Victorian State League Division 3 table and were relegated to Victorian Provisional League Division 1 North-West for the 2012 season.

The club debuted in the FFV State Knockout Cup in the 2012 tournament, where Rangers defeated Warrnambool Wolves in a 5–2 home victory in a second round fixture on 17 March.

Divisional history

Recent seasons

Honours
Victorian State League Division 3 North-West: 2008, 2016
Victorian Metropolitan League Division 3: 1984
Victorian Metropolitan League Division 4: 1983
Victorian Provisional League Division 1 North-West: 2005
Geelong Advertiser Cup: 1987, 2009, 2019
FFV State Knockout Cup: Zone Semi-Finals (2012)

International representatives

Australia 

 Johnny Gardiner, member of the Australia national soccer team

Scotland 

 Frank Munro, member of the Scotland national football team

Current squad

First-team

References

External links
 Official Website
 Football Federation Victoria

1955 establishments in Australia
Association football clubs established in 1955
Sport in Geelong
Soccer clubs in Victoria (Australia)
Scottish-Australian culture
Diaspora sports clubs in Australia